"Satellite Blues" is a song by Australian rock band AC/DC, released as a single, and appeared on their 2000 album, Stiff Upper Lip. It peaked at No. 23 on the ARIA Singles Chart. This was AC/DC's last single until the release of 2008's "Rock 'N Roll Train" from Black Ice.

In the United States Billboard magazine, it reached No. 7 on their Mainstream Rock chart.

Music video

The official music video for the song was directed by Andy Morahan. It shows the band performing the song on-board a space station.

Personnel
Brian Johnson – lead vocals
Angus Young – lead guitar
Malcolm Young – rhythm guitar, backing vocals
Cliff Williams – bass guitar, backing vocals
Phil Rudd – drums

References 

2000 songs
2001 singles
AC/DC songs
East West Records singles
EMI Records singles
Music videos directed by Andy Morahan
Song recordings produced by George Young (rock musician)
Songs written by Angus Young
Songs written by Malcolm Young